The Cuyuna Range mine is a mine located in the north of the United States in Minnesota. Cuyuna Range represents one of the largest manganese reserve in the United States having estimated reserves of 247 million tons of manganese ore grading 8% manganese metal.

See also 
 Lists of mines in the United States

References 

Manganese mines in the United States